DHT (sometimes stylized as D.H.T., acronym for Dance House Trance) was a Belgian duo consisting of singer Edmée Daenen (born 25 March 1985 in Kortrijk) and Flor Theeuwes, also known as DJ Da Rick (born 28 August 1976 in Turnhout). It had a hit in the US and Australia in 2005, with its cover version of "Listen to Your Heart", originally recorded by Roxette. The track reached number seven on the UK Singles Chart in December of that year. Marketing of the song often referenced DHT as an acronym for Definite Hit Track. On 14 June, 2019, the duo unveiled a previously unreleased album, titled #2 on Apple Music, Spotify, and other music portals.

They have been one of the very few artists to crack the US Billboard Hot 100 top 10 with a trance song.

Discography

Albums
Listen to Your Heart (19 July 2005)
Listen to Your Heart [Dance & Unplugged] (2-disc set) (12 August 2006)
#2 (14 June 2019)

Singles

References

External links
DHT's official website
Official US Billboard chart history
Impartproductions.com

Musical groups disestablished in 2010
Belgian pop music groups
Belgian trance music groups
Belgian dance music groups
Belgian musical duos
Electronic music duos
Male–female musical duos